Pride of the Range is a 1910 American short silent Western film directed by Francis Boggs. It features Hoot Gibson in his first on-screen role.

Cast
 Tom Mix 
 Art Acord
 Milton Brown
 Hoot Gibson
 Al Green
 Betty Harte
 Tom Santschi

See also
 List of American films of 1910
 Hoot Gibson filmography
 Tom Mix filmography

References

External links
 

1910 films
1910 Western (genre) films
1910 short films
American silent short films
American black-and-white films
Silent American Western (genre) films
1910s American films
1910s English-language films